Luan Vukatana (born 13 January 1959) is an Albanian retired football midfielder.

Club career
Vukatana joined the senior team of Vllaznia Shkodër at age 16 and won 2 league titles and three domestic cups with the club. With Roland Luçi, he scored a "passed penalty" goal in a 1981 Albanian Cup trashing of KS Pogradeci. In 2009, Vukatana was chosen in a best ever Vllaznia XI in the history of the club.

International career
He made his debut for Albania in a September 1982 European Championship qualification match away against Austria and earned a total of 8 caps, scoring no goals. His final international was another European Championship qualification match, in November 1983 against West Germany.

Honours
Albanian Superliga: 2
 1978, 1983

Albanian Cup: 3
 1979, 1981, 1987

References

External links

1959 births
Living people
Footballers from Shkodër
Albanian footballers
Association football midfielders
Albania international footballers
KF Vllaznia Shkodër players
Kategoria Superiore players